Phipps v Pears [1964] is an English land law case, concerning easements.  The case concerns walls other than those governed by the Party Wall Act. Party walls are those which are touch or are shared or agreed to be party walls. The court held the law will not imply or invent a new form of negative easement to prevent a neighbour's wall being pulled down which offers some protection (and no special agreement or covenant is in place).

Facts
The wall of a newly built house, at number 16 Market Street, Warwick, was very close to the adjoining one, number 14, and was not rendered to make it weatherproof nor well-reinforced to make it strong against wind. The house at number 14 was demolished. This left the wall of number 16 exposed. Cracks soon appeared. Number 16's owner claimed damages against his neighbour for repairing the wall. He pled for the court to find a new kind of negative easement (which would, by extension from analogous types of easement) forbid the earlier, neighbour's wall being pulled down.

Judgment
Lord Denning MR held that there could be no new easement. To be recognised under the Law of Property Act 1925 section 62, the right has to be capable of existing as an easement.

Cases applied
Webb v Bird (1863) (see above summary)

Cases followed
Unnamed decision of Master of Rolls in Ireland regarding removal of trees.

See also

English land law
Party Wall Act

Notes

English land case law
Court of Appeal (England and Wales) cases
1964 in case law
1964 in British law